Villarreal de Huerva is a municipality located in the province of Zaragoza, Aragon, Spain. According to the 2010 census, the municipality has a population of 202 inhabitants.

This town is named after the Huerva River.

Gallery

See also
Campo de Daroca
List of municipalities in Zaragoza

References

External links

Villarreal de Huerva - Tourism

Municipalities in the Province of Zaragoza